NGC 2613 is a spiral galaxy in the southern constellation of Pyxis, next to the western constellation border with Puppis. It was discovered by the German-born astronomer William Herschel on November 20, 1784. With an apparent visual magnitude of 10.5, the galaxy is faintly visible using a telescope with a  aperture. It appears spindle-shaped as it is almost edge-on to observers on Earth.

The morphological classification of NGC 2613 is SA(s)b, indicating a spiral galaxy with no bar or ring, and moderately tightly-wound spiral arms. It is inclined by an angle of approximately 79° to the line of sight from the Earth and is oriented with the long axis along a position angle of 133°.

NGC 2613 has an active galactic nucleus that is deeply embedded in obscuring gas and dust. Emission data collected by the Very Large Array shows a feature resembling a tidal tail along the southeast side of the galaxy, which was most likely produced by an interaction with the small companion galaxy, ESO 495-G017, now located to the northwest of NGC 2613.

References

External links
 

Intermediate spiral galaxies
Pyxis (constellation)
2613
023997